Oleg Semyonovich Shenin (2 July 1937 – 28 May 2009) was the leader of the Communist Party of the Soviet Union (Shenin), which should not be confused with the larger UCP-CPSU.

Shenin was a member of the Central Committee of the Communist Party of the Soviet Union; he was also a member of the Politburo and Secretariat from 1990 to 1991. During the Soviet coup attempt of 1991, he was a member of the group of CPSU CC members who tried to regain control of the country in order to re-establish the Soviet Union. On 23 August he was jailed for his involvement in the events. In October 1992, for health reasons, he was released with a change in the preventive measure to a recognizance not to leave. He was given amnesty in 1994.

Shenin was the founding Chairman of the Union of Communist Parties - Communist Party of the Soviet Union (UCP-CPSU) from 1993, until he broke away from the Communist Party of the Russian Federation (CPRF) in 2001, after its leader Gennady Zyuganov refused to back the creation of a united Communist Party of Russia and Belarus. Zyuganov then replaced Shenin as chairman of the Council of the Union of Communist Parties-CPSU.

In September 1997, he met with North Korean leader Kim Jong-il in Pyongyang.

Presidential campaign
Shenin applied to run as a presidential candidate for the 2008 Russian presidential election but was denied registration for failing to complete some paperwork correctly. According to Shenin, his candidacy was rejected because he did not provide a letter from his employer; he described this as an "idiotic pretext" because he had been retired for years.

Death
Shenin died on 28 May 2009 aged 71 from a severe and prolonged illness.

References

1937 births
2009 deaths
Soviet politicians
Party leaders of the Soviet Union
Communist Party of the Soviet Union members
Russian communists
Russian nationalists
Russian Marxists
Antisemitism in Russia
Politburo of the Central Committee of the Communist Party of the Soviet Union members
People of the 1991 Soviet coup d'état attempt
Burials in Troyekurovskoye Cemetery